Kendriya Vidyalaya Pattom (KV Pattom) is a school in Pattom, Thiruvananthapuram, India. It was established in 1964 as a civil sector school affiliated to CBSE.

KV Pattom runs with two shifts from Class I to Class XII, with a roll of 3500+ students and 100+ staff.

Description 
The first shift (morning shift) at KV Pattom runs from 06.30 to 12.00 IST.  It  offers science, commerce and humanities streams for 10th to 12th grade students.

The second shift (afternoon shift) runs from 12.00 to 18.00 IST. It offers science and commerce streams.

KV Pattom celebrated its golden jubilee year in 2014.

History
In 1964, the Government of Kerala donated five acres to build KV Pattom  In 1968, the buildings were completed   In 1969 the first group of Higher Secondary Students (Class XI) completed their courses.

In 1977, KV Pattom started a "10+2" system started. In 1982 a new science block was opened.

In 1996, KV Pattom was declared as a Model KV. In 1998, the primary block was inaugurated. On 10 September 2004, the second shift was introduced.

In April 2008, KV Pattom inaugurated a fully automated library. In 2009 the school won the KVS-Intel Technology in Education Award for Schools. In 2010, the Online Academic Social Networking Project Library Junction won the NCERT National Innovation and Experimentation Award.

KV Pattom was ranked as the Best Govt Day School in the country by Education World in 2015, 2016, 2017 and 2020.

In August 2021 the librarian, S L Faisal, was awarded the National Teacher's Award, which is one of the most prestigious and coveted recognition given to the meritorious teachers in primary, middle, and secondary schools in India, for his services in redesigning the concept of school libraries and enabling the students to acquire skills through innovative learning programs.

The 2019-20 Batch is considered by far the best batch in history of Kendriya Vidyalaya. It's the last batch to receive excursion organised by the school and it's also the last batch to attend school before COVID.

Alumni
 Prof (DR).G. Mohan Gopal ( Director, RGICS)
 T. P. Sitaraman IFS
Sashi Warrier (writer)
 Dr. Uma Sivaraman (DC, KVS)
 Dr. Jayathilak IAS
Dr. Ciji Thomas IAS
 Dr. Manish Valiyathan
Keerthy Suresh (Actor),
Nikhil IAS
Thushara G S Pillai (Scientist)
Giri Sankar S (PWOLI)
Ganesh Mani (1972–78, on the rolls as M. Ganesh; https://www.andrew.cmu.edu/user/ganeshm/)

References

External links
 
RGICS

Educational institutions established in 1964
Kendriya Vidyalayas in Kerala
1964 establishments in Kerala
High schools and secondary schools in Thiruvananthapuram